The 2019–20 Supercopa de España Femenina was the first edition of the Supercopa de España Femenina, an annual women's football competition for clubs in the Spanish football league system that were successful in its major competitions in the preceding season.

In December 2019, it was announced that the competition would be created with a four-team format, which would include a semi-final round, similar to the new format established for the men's tournament. On 10 January 2020, the Royal Spanish Football Federation announced that the tournament would be played in Salamanca.

Qualification 
The tournament featured both finalists from the 2018–19 Copa de la Reina and the remaining highest ranked teams from the 2018–19 Primera División that had not already qualified through the cup final.

Qualified teams 
The following four teams qualified for the tournament.

Draw
The draw was held on 16 January 2020 in Salamanca, without restrictions in it.

Matches
All three matches were held at the Helmántico Stadium in Salamanca.

Bracket

Semi-finals

Final

See also
2019–20 Primera División (women)
2019–20 Copa de la Reina

References

2019–20 in Spanish football cups
2019